Trifolium repens, the white clover, is a herbaceous perennial plant in the bean family Fabaceae (otherwise known as Leguminosae). It is native to Europe, including the British Isles, and central Asia and is one of the most widely cultivated types of clover. It has been widely introduced worldwide as a forage crop, and is now also common in most grassy areas (lawns and gardens) of North America, Australia and New Zealand. The species includes varieties often classed as small, intermediate and large, according to height, which reflects petiole length. The term 'white clover' is applied to the species in general, 'Dutch clover' is often applied to intermediate varieties (but sometimes to smaller varieties), and 'ladino clover' is applied to large varieties.

Name 

The species name, is Latin for "creeping".

Description 
It is a herbaceous, perennial plant. It is low growing, with heads of whitish flowers, often with a tinge of pink or cream that may come on with the aging of the plant. The flowers are mostly visited by bumblebees and often by honey bees. The leaves are trifoliolate, smooth, elliptic to egg-shaped and long-petioled and usually with light or dark markings. The stems function as stolons, so white clover often forms mats, with the stems creeping as much as  a year, and rooting at the nodes. The leaves form the symbol known as shamrock. Almost always, a white clover will be trifoliolate. However, one can, but only sometimes, possess four or more leaflets.

Varieties and subspecies
Trifolium repens subsp. macrorrhizum (Boiss.) Ponert
Trifolium repens var. nevadense (Boiss.) C.Vicioso
Trifolium repens var. ochranthum K.Maly
Trifolium repens var. orbelicum (Velen.) Fritsch
Trifolium repens var. orphanideum (Boiss.) Boiss.
Trifolium repens subsp. prostratum Nyman

Distribution
It is native in Europe and Central Asia, ubiquitous throughout the British Isles, introduced in North America, South Africa, Australia, New Zealand, Japan and elsewhere, and globally cultivated as a forage crop.

White clover has been used as a model organism for global research into ecology and urban evolution. As part of the Global Urban Evolution Project (GLUE) scientists from 26 countries examined the production of cyanide by over 110,000 clover plants from 160 cities. Cyanide can be useful to clover plants as a deterrent to herbivores.
Analyzing urban-rural differences, scientists found that cyanide production tended to increase with distance from the center of cities, suggesting that clover populations were adapting to factors commonly found in urban centers worldwide. Possible factors could include temperature (freezing is related to cyanide content), herbivory pressures, and drought stress. As clover habitats, the downtowns of cities may more closely resemble other far-flung cities than nearby rural areas.

Ancestry 
Trifolium repens is a tetraploid (4n=32) with two diploid ancestors. In order to increase genetic diversity for breeding, research is focused on finding these ancestors. Proposed ancestors of Trifolium repens include Trifolium nigrescens, Trifolium occidentale, Trifolium pallescens, and Trifolium uniflorum. Additionally, it is possible that one of the diploid ancestors has yet to be analyzed, either because it has not been discovered or is extinct.

Cultivation and uses

Forage
White clover has been described as the most important forage legume of the temperate zones. White clover is commonly grown in mixtures with forage grasses, e.g. perennial ryegrass (Lolium perenne). Such mixtures can not only optimize livestock production, but can also reduce the bloat risk to livestock that can be associated with excessive white clover in pastures. Such species mixtures also tend to avoid issues that could otherwise be associated with cyanogenic glycosides (linamarin and lotaustralin) intake on pure or nearly pure stands of some white clover varieties. However, problems do not inevitably arise with grazing on monocultures of white clover, and superior ruminant production is sometimes achieved on white clover monocultures managed to optimize sward height.

Formononetin and biochanin A play a role in arbuscular mycorrhiza formation on white clover roots, and foliar disease can stimulate production of estrogenic coumestans in white clover. However, while there have been a few reports of phytoestrogenic effects of white clover on grazing ruminants, these have been far less common than such reports regarding some varieties of subterranean clover (Trifolium subterraneum) and red clover (Trifolium pratense). Among forage plants, some white clover varieties tend to be favored by rather close grazing, because of their stoloniferous habit, which can contribute to competitive advantage.

Companion planting, green manure, and cover crops  
White clover grows well as a companion plant among lawns, grain crops, pasture grasses, and vegetable rows. It is often added to lawn seed mixes, as it is able to grow and provide green cover in poorer soils where turfgrasses do not perform well. White clover can tolerate close mowing and grazing, and it can grow on many different types and pHs of soil (although it prefers clay soils). As a leguminous and hardy plant, it is considered to be a beneficial component of natural or organic pasture management and lawn care due to its ability to fix nitrogen and out-compete weeds. Natural nitrogen fixing reduces leaching from the soil and by maintaining soil health can reduce the incidence of some lawn diseases that are enhanced by the availability of synthetic fertilizer. For these reasons, it is often used as a green manure and cover crop.

Culinary uses 
Besides making an excellent forage crop for livestock, its leaves and flowers are a valuable survival food: they are high in proteins, and are widespread and abundant. The fresh plants have been used for centuries as additives to salads and other meals consisting of leafy vegetables. They are not easy for humans to digest raw, but, this is however easily fixed by boiling the harvested plants for 5–10 minutes. Native Americans ate some species raw. Dried white clover flowers may also be smoked as a herbal alternative to tobacco.

Medicinal uses 
In India, T. repens is considered a folk medicine against intestinal helminthic worms, and an experimental in-vivo study validated that the aerial shoots of T. repens bear significant anticestodal (anti-tapeworm) properties.

Etymology
Trifolium means 'trefoil' (three-lobed leaves); this is Pliny’s name for trifoliate plants.

Repens means 'creeping' or 'stoloniferous'.

References 

Tangpu, V., Temjenmongla & Yadav, A. K. 2004. Anticestodal activity of Trifolium repens extract. Pharmaceutical Biology 42: 656–658.

External links 

 United States Department of Agriculture Trifolium repens fact sheet
 Mother Earth News, Masanobu Fukuoka 'One-Straw Revolution'
 Cyanogenesis in White Clover - video and commentary
 Root nodules of White Clover - video and commentary

repens
Flora of Africa
Flora of Europe
Flora of Asia
Medicinal plants of Europe
Medicinal plants of Africa
Garden plants of Europe
Forages
Nitrogen-fixing crops
Groundcovers
Plants described in 1753
Plants used in traditional Native American medicine
National symbols of the Republic of Ireland
Melliferous flowers
Taxa named by Carl Linnaeus